Paulo da Cruz Diogo (born 21 April 1975) is a Swiss former professional footballer of Portuguese descent. He played much of his professional career in the Swiss first division.

He is now manager of ES FC Malley which he joined in July 2021.

Career 
On 5 December 2004, playing for Servette FC in an away game against FC Schaffhausen, Diogo set up a goal for Jean Beausejour in the 87th minute of the game. By way of celebration, he jumped up on the metal perimeter fence separating the fans from the pitch. Unnoticed by him, his wedding ring caught in the barrier (Diogo had married not long before). As he jumped off the fence, much of his finger tore off along with the ring.

To add insult to injury, referee Florian Etter then penalized him with a yellow card for excessive time-wasting with his "celebrations". In fact, the match stewards were searching for his finger. Later that night, Diogo was taken to a Zürich hospital, but the doctors failed to re-attach the severed part of the finger and advised that the remaining part of his finger be amputated to the first joint. He has continued to play football since the accident. The event generated international commotion, and served as a warning of the danger of hanging on places or objects while using any type of  ring, such as the wedding ring.

After being released by Sion, he signed for FC Schaffhausen on 28 January 2006.

References

External links
weltfussball.de profile  

Lausanne Sport profile 

Swiss men's footballers
Swiss amputees
1975 births
Living people
Swiss people of Portuguese descent
FC Lausanne-Sport players
Servette FC players
Grenoble Foot 38 players
FC Schaffhausen players
FC Sion players
Yverdon-Sport FC players
Association football midfielders
Sportspeople from the canton of Vaud